The 2009 World Women's Handball Championship was the 19th edition, second to take place outside Europe, of the international championship tournament in women's team sport handball that is governed by the International Handball Federation (IHF). China hosted the event from 5-20 December 2009. Russia successfully contested France in the final, their fourth title.

Venues
The competition took place in the Chinese province of Jiangsu. It was the second women's World Championship organized outside of Europe, the first was in South Korea 1990.

Six cities were on the short list to host the matches:

Qualification

Host Nation
 

Defending Champions
 

Qualified from the 2008 Asian Championship
 
 
 
 

Qualified from the 2008 European Championship
 
 

Qualified from European play-offs
European play-offs were played from 6-7 June 2009 (first leg) and 12-14 June 2009 (second leg). Qualified teams are marked in bold.

|}

Qualified from the 2008 African Championship
 
 
 
 

Qualified from the 2009 Pan-American Championship
The 2009 Pan-American Championship took place from 23-27 June in Santiago, Chile. The three highest ranked teams qualified directly.
 
 
 

Qualified from the 2009 Oceania Handball Nations Cup
The 2009 Oceania Championship took place in Brisbane, Australia, from 25-30 May. The host team won the competition and thus qualified directly.

Squads

Group A
 (squad)
 (squad)
 (squad)
 (squad)
 (squad)
 (squad)

Group B
 (squad)
 (squad)
 (squad)
 (squad)
 (squad)
 (squad)

Group C
 (squad)
 (squad)
 (squad)
 (squad)
 (squad)
 (squad)

Group D
 (squad)
 (squad)
 (squad)
 (squad)
 (squad)
 (squad)

Each nation had to submit an initial squad of 28 players, 12 of them became reserves when the final squad of 16 players was announced on 5 December 2009.

Preliminary round
The draw for the preliminary round was held on 15 July 2009 at the IHF headquarters in Basel, Switzerland. Teams placed first, second and third will qualify for the Main Round.

Group A

Group B

Group C

Group D

Main Round

Group I

Group II

President's Cup
Placement matches for teams eliminated after preliminary round.

Group President's Cup 1

Group President's Cup 2

Placement Matches
13-24 December: Final placement matches for Presidents Cup.
5-12 December: Placement matches for teams eliminated after main round.

23rd / 24th Place

21st / 22nd Place

19th / 20th Place

17th / 18th Place

15th / 16th Place

13th / 14th Place

11th / 12th Place

9th / 10th Place

Seventh place game

Fifth place game

Final round

Semifinals

Bronze medal game

Final

Ranking and Statistics

Final ranking

All Star Team
Goalkeeper: 
Left wing: 
Left back: 
Pivot: 
Centre back: 
Right back: 
Right wing: 
Chosen by team officials and IHF experts: IHF.info

Top Goalkeepers

Source: IHF.info

Top goalscorers

Source: IHF.info

Other awards
Most Valuable Player: 
Chosen by team officials and IHF experts: IHF.info

References

External links

2009 WC Qualification (Format and Results)

World Handball Championship tournaments
International handball competitions hosted by China
H
Women's handball in China
World Women's Handball Championship
December 2009 sports events in China